The 21st annual Webby Awards were held at Cipriani Wall Street in New York City on May 15, 2017, which was hosted by comedian and actor Joel McHale. The Webby Awards have been dubbed the "internet's highest honor" and, in 2017, received nearly 13,000 entries from 70 countries.

Winners

(from http://webbyawards.com/winners/2017/)

References

External links
Official site

2017
2017 awards in the United States
2017 in New York City
May 2017 events in the United States
2017 in Internet culture